Tiquadra vilis is a moth of the family Tineidae. It is known from Brazil and Argentina.

This species has a wingspan of 17–21 mm.

References

Hapsiferinae
Moths described in 1922
Moths of South America